Great Britain is a nation that has competed at eight Hopman Cup tournaments and appeared in the first edition in 1989. Great Britain's best result is finishing runner-up to Spain at the 2010 Hopman Cup. Their most successful player is Andy Murray, who was one of that year's finalists.

Players
This is a list of players who have played for Great Britain in the Hopman Cup.

Results

References

Hopman Cup teams
Hopman Cup